Nyceryx lunaris is a moth of the  family Sphingidae. It is known from Ecuador.

Adults are probably on wing year round.

References

Nyceryx
Moths described in 1912